HD 53811 is a class A4IV (white subgiant) star in the constellation Puppis. Its apparent magnitude is 4.92 and it is approximately 198 light years away based on parallax.

References

Puppis
A-type subgiants
Puppis, H
CD-49 2587
034059
2672
053811